Siriyari is a small town situated in State of Rajasthan, District Pali. It is situated on State Highway 62 connecting  Sojat, Sojat Road, Siriyari, Phulad, Jojawar. This village has a police station connected to nearby Police posts in villages.

It is famous as death place of Acharya Bhikshu (1726–1803) who was the founder and first spiritual head of the Shwatambar Terapanth sect of Jainism.
There is a famous temple on his name, which has been a new landmark.

History 
Siriyari was granted to Khet Singh Solanki, by his father Sawant Singh Solanki of Desuri. Raja Sur Singh of Jodhpur married to Khet Singh's daughter Rani Manorath Kanwar on 18th February 1594.  Khet Singh, his son Sanga Singh died fighting for Mewar, in battles against Mughals. 

Thakur Mahesh Das, son of Rao Kumpa of Marwar, was father of a son, Thakur Aas Karan, who was granted the estate of Digai in 1616. His eldest son, Thakur Amar Singh succeeded in Digai and won Siriyari from the Solanki Rajputs in a battle in 1635.

Connectivity 
District Headquarter: Pali (74 km)
Nearest Railway Station: Sojat Road (24 km) and Marwar Junction
Buses are available all time from Sojat Road which is best spot for getting via Roads.

References 

 

Villages in Pali district